Come See the Paradise is a 1990 American drama film written and directed by Alan Parker, and starring Dennis Quaid and Tamlyn Tomita. Set before and during World War II, the film depicts the treatment of Japanese Americans in the United States following the attack on Pearl Harbor, and the subsequent loss of civil liberties within the framework of a love story.

Plot
In the early 1950s, Lily Kawamura tells her pre-adolescent daughter Mini about her father and the life that she barely remembers, as the two of them are walking to a rural train station.

In 1936, Jack McGurn is a motion picture projectionist, involved in a campaign of harassment against non-union theaters in New York City.  One such attack turns fatal, as one of his fellow union members starts a fire.  McGurn's boss, knowing that the feelings of guilt would likely cause Jack to go to the police, urges him to leave the city. Jack moves to Los Angeles where his brother Gerry lives.  Jack's role as a "sweatshop lawyer" strains an already-rocky relationship with Gerry who is willing to have any job, barely keeping his family afloat during the Great Depression.

Taking the name McGann, Jack finds a job as a non-union projectionist in a movie theater run by a Japanese American family by the name of Kawamura. He falls in love with Lily, his boss' daughter. Forbidden to see one another by her Issei parents and banned from marrying by California law, the couple elopes to Seattle, where they marry and have a daughter, Mini.

When World War II breaks out, Lily and their daughter are caught up in the Japanese American internment, rounded up and sent to Manzanar, California.  Jack, away on a trip, is drafted into the United States Army with no chance to help his family prepare for their imprisonment.

Finally visiting the camp, he arranges a private meeting with his wife's father, telling him that he has gone AWOL and wants to stay with them, whatever they have to go through.  They are his family now and he belongs with them.  The older man counsels him to return to the Army, and says that he now believes that Jack is truly in love with Lily, and a worthy husband.

Returning, ready to face his punishment for desertion, he is met by FBI agents, who have identified "McGann" as being the McGurn wanted for his part in the arson of years before.

Finally, in the 1950s, the train arrives and Lily and Mini reunite with Jack, who has served his time in prison and is now returning to his family.

Title
The title of the film is inspired by a line of the short poem "I Hear The Oriole's Always-Grieving Voice" by Russian poet Anna Akhmatova, which ends with the following lines:
 

Writer Alan Parker was unable to locate Akhmatova's original poem and wrote his own poem before writing the script to try and say what the film would say:

Cast

Reception
On review aggregator Rotten Tomatoes, the film has a 'fresh' 64% rating based on 11 reviews, with an average rating of 5.5/10. Noted Chicago Sun Times critic Roger Ebert gave it 3 stars out of 4 and wrote that "Come See the Paradise is a fable to remind us of how easily we can surrender our liberties, and how much we need them." The film was entered into the 1990 Cannes Film Festival.

Awards and nominations

Oscar bait
A 2014 study by Gabriel Rossman and Oliver Schilke, two sociologists at the University of California at Los Angeles (UCLA), identified Come See the Paradise as the most deliberate example of Oscar bait in their study of 3,000 films released since 1985. The identification is based on various elements calculated to be likely to draw Oscar nominations, including the previous nominations of Parker, the film's setting in Hollywood (including Quaid's projectionist character), and its depiction of a tragic historical event against the background of war and racism. It was only released in a few cities during the last week of that year to make it eligible for the awards. However, it was not nominated for any Oscars and failed at the box office.

Home video releases
The VHS tape was released June 12, 1991. The DVD version was released June 6, 2006 and included a 2-sided disc:
Side A: Movie, audio commentary by writer/director Sir Alan Parker
Side B: Images of Come See the Paradise featurette, The Making of the Film essay by Sir Alan Parker, Rabbit in the Moon 1999 documentary, theatrical trailers
The film made its Blu-ray debut in November 2012 in Sweden.

Soundtrack legacy
A track from the film's score by Randy Edelman titled "Fire in a Brooklyn Theater" became an oft used musical cue for the trailers of other films, including those for A Few Good Men, Thirteen Days, Clear and Present Danger, Patriot Games, The Sum of All Fears, Devil In A Blue Dress, Rob Roy, The Chamber, Instinct, and Cry, The Beloved Country.

See also
Cinema Paradiso – 1989 Oscar-winning film similar in content
1990 in film
Academy Awards

References

External links

1990 films
1990 romantic drama films
1990s war drama films
20th Century Fox films
American romantic drama films
American war drama films
Films about Japanese Americans
Films about the internment of Japanese Americans
1990s Japanese-language films
1990s English-language films
Films directed by Alan Parker
Films set in the 1930s
Films set in the 1940s
Films set in a movie theatre
Films set in Los Angeles
Films set in New York City
Films set in Seattle
Films shot in Washington (state)
Films set in Washington (state)
Films set in Oregon
Films shot in Oregon
Films shot in Seattle
Films shot in Astoria, Oregon
Films shot in Portland, Oregon
Films about interracial romance
Films with screenplays by Alan Parker
Films scored by Randy Edelman
Japan in non-Japanese culture
Asian-American drama films
1990s American films